Adhikarichaur is a village development committee in Baglung District in the Dhaulagiri Zone of central Nepal. At the time of the 1991 Nepal census it had a population of 5,389 and had 1021 houses in the town. It contains the Shiba Primary School.

References

Populated places in Baglung District